The Battle of Arnhem was a battle of the Second World War at the vanguard of the Allied Operation Market Garden. It was fought in and around the Dutch city of Arnhem, the town of Oosterbeek, the villages Wolfheze and Driel and the vicinity from 17 to 26 September 1944. The Allies were poised to enter the Netherlands after sweeping through France and Belgium in the summer of 1944, after the Battle of Normandy. Operation Market Garden was proposed by Field Marshal Sir Bernard Montgomery, who favoured a single push northwards over the branches of the Lower Rhine River, allowing the British Second Army to bypass the Siegfried Line and attack the Ruhr. US Airborne troops were dropped in the Netherlands to secure bridges and towns along the line of the Allied advance. Farthest north, the British 1st Airborne Division landed at Arnhem to capture bridges across the Nederrijn (Lower Rhine), supported by men of the Glider Pilot Regiment and the 1st Polish Parachute Brigade. The British XXX Corps were expected to reach the British airborne forces in two to three days.

The 1st Airborne Division landed some distance from its objectives and was hampered by unexpected resistance, especially from elements of the 9th and 10th SS Panzer Divisions. Only a small force was able to reach the Arnhem road bridge while the advance of the main body of the division was stopped on the outskirts of the town. XXX Corps was unable to advance north from Nijmegen in the Battle of Nijmegen as quickly as planned and the British airborne troops were not relieved according to schedule. After four days, the small British force at the bridge was overwhelmed and the rest of the division trapped in a small pocket north of the river. The paratroops could not be sufficiently reinforced by the Poles or XXX Corps when they arrived on the southern bank, nor by Royal Air Force supply flights. After nine days of fighting, the remnants of the division were withdrawn in Operation Berlin. The Allies were unable to advance further with no secure bridges over the Nederrijn and the front line stabilised south of Arnhem. The 1st Airborne Division lost nearly three quarters of its strength and did not see combat again.

Background

By September 1944, Allied forces had broken out of their Normandy beachhead and pursued the remnants of the German armies across northern France and Belgium. Although Allied commanders generally favoured a broad front policy to continue the advance into Germany and the Netherlands, Field Marshal Bernard Montgomery proposed a bold plan to head north through Dutch Gelderland, bypassing the German Siegfried Line defences and opening a route into the German industrial heartland of the Ruhr. Initially proposed as a British and Polish operation codenamed Operation Comet, the plan was soon expanded to involve most of the First Allied Airborne Army and a set-piece ground advance into the Netherlands, codenamed Market Garden.

Montgomery's plan involved dropping the US 101st Airborne Division to capture bridges around Eindhoven, the US 82nd Airborne Division to capture crossings around Nijmegen and the British 1st Airborne Division, with the Polish 1st Independent Parachute Brigade, to capture three bridges across the Nederrijn at Arnhem. Lieutenant General Lewis Brereton commanded the First Allied Airborne Army but his second-in-command Lieutenant-General Frederick Browning took command of the airborne operation. The British Second Army, led by XXX Corps, would advance up the "Airborne corridor", securing the airborne divisions' positions and crossing the Rhine within two days. If successful, the plan would open the door to Germany and hopefully force an end to the war in Europe by the end of the year.

British plan

With the British 6th Airborne Division still refitting after Operation Tonga and the fighting in Normandy, the task of securing the Rhine bridgehead fell to the 1st Airborne Division under the command of Major-General Roy Urquhart. The division was made up of three brigades of infantry (two parachute, one glider-borne), supporting artillery of the 1st Airlanding Light Regiment and anti-tank batteries and Royal Engineer units, as well as supporting elements such as the Royal Army Service Corps and Royal Army Medical Corps. Most of the division had seen action in North Africa and Sicily, particularly the 1st Parachute Brigade and 1st Airlanding Brigade. This was the first time the division had fought as a complete formation. Urquhart also had the 1st Independent Polish Parachute Brigade under his command. His force was also substantially reinforced by some 1,200 men of the Glider Pilot Regiment, who would fly the glider-borne infantry and vehicles into Arnhem, providing the equivalent of two battalions of infantry for the operation. Smaller additions included a Dutch commando unit and American communications teams.

The division was required to secure the road, rail and pontoon bridges over the Nederrijn at Arnhem and hold them for two to three days until relieved by XXX Corps. From the beginning Urquhart was severely constrained in his planning for the operation. The US IX Troop Carrier Command (Major General Williams) could not land all the airborne troops in one go. Williams decided that it would only be possible to fly one air lift per day, meaning it would take three days to deliver the division and Polish Brigade. Few areas were suitable for glider landings and Williams was reluctant to send his aircraft too close to Arnhem and into the flak from Deelen airfield after the drop.

Urquhart decided to land the 1st Parachute Brigade (Brigadier Gerald Lathbury) and the 1st Airlanding Brigade (Brigadier Philip "Pip" Hicks') on the first day of the operation, along with Divisional HQ, the 1st Airlanding Light Regiment, Royal Artillery and attached Royal Engineer and medical units. The Airlanding Brigade would land on LZs 'S' and 'Z' and move to secure the drop zones and landing zones for the following days' drops, whilst the three battalions of the parachute brigade would arrive at DZ 'X' and follow separate routes to the Arnhem bridges. The 2nd Battalion (Lieutenant colonel (Lt. Col.) John Frost) would follow the riverside roads to the centre of Arnhem (Lion route) and secure the main road and railway bridges, as well as a pontoon bridge between them. The 3rd Battalion (Lt. Col. Fitch) would head through Oosterbeek to Arnhem (Tiger route), assist in the capture of the road bridge and take up positions in the east of the town. The 1st Battalion (Lt. Col. Dobie) would follow Leopard route north of the railway line to occupy high ground north and north west of Arnhem.

On the second day, the 4th Parachute Brigade (Brigadier John "Shan" Hackett) would arrive at DZ 'Y', accompanied by extra artillery units and the rest of the Airlanding Brigade on LZ 'X'. Hackett's three battalions would then reinforce the positions north and north west of Arnhem. On the third day, the 1st Independent Polish Parachute Brigade would be dropped south of the river at DZ 'K'. Using the road bridge, they would reinforce the perimeter east of Arnhem, linking with their artillery which would be flown in by glider to LZ 'L'. The 1st Airlanding Brigade would fall back to cover Oosterbeek on the western side of the perimeter and 1st Parachute Brigade would fall back to cover the southern side of the bridges. The remaining units of the division would follow XXX Corps on land in what was known as the sea tail. Once XXX Corps had arrived and advanced beyond the bridgehead, the 52nd (Lowland) Infantry Division would land at Deelen airfield to support the ground forces north of the Rhine. The operation would be supplied by daily flights by 38 Group and 46 Group RAF who would make the first drop on LZ 'L' on day 2 and subsequent drops on DZ 'V'.

Intelligence
The division was told to expect only limited resistance from German reserve forces. A serious challenge to their operation was not expected and many men believed that their work would lead to the ending of the war. Some – anticipating a period of occupation in Germany – packed leisure equipment in their kit or in the sea tail. Browning's intelligence officer – Major Brian Urquhart — obtained information from the 21st Army Group in Belgium and Dutch resistance that German armour was present around Arnhem. This was backed up with aerial reconnaissance that he ordered to be flown. Browning was dismissive and ordered his chief medical officer to have Urquhart sent on sick leave. SHAEF was aware that there were almost certainly two Panzer divisions at Arnhem but with the operation looming chose to ignore them. Such information would have been gleaned from Ultra intercepts that the First Allied Airborne Army was not privy to and therefore could not act upon themselves.

German forces

The Allied liberation of Antwerp on 4 September had caused a rout of German reserve troops in the Netherlands, nicknamed "Mad Tuesday". The Allied pause at the Dutch border gave the Germans time to regroup although it would make subsequent attempts to clarify the exact German forces opposing the Allies extremely difficult. Generalfeldmarschall Walter Model — commander of Army Group B — had moved his headquarters to Arnhem and was re-establishing defences in the area and co-ordinating the reorganisation of the scattered units so that by the time the Allies launched Market Garden there would be several units opposing them. To the west of Arnhem was Kampfgruppe Von Tettau, a force equivalent to seven battalions made up of all manner of German units (including Heer, Luftwaffe, Kriegsmarine, rear echelon and Waffen-SS troops) under the command of General Hans von Tettau at Grebbeberg. This included the SS Non-commissioned officer school SS Unteroffizierschule Arnheim and the 16th SS Training Battalion under the command of SS Sturmbannführer Sepp Krafft, whose unit would play a crucial role in the opening phases of the battle. Within Arnhem itself, the town garrison was under the command of Major-General Friedrich Kussin.

The II SS Panzer Corps (Obergruppenführer Wilhelm Bittrich)— comprising the remains of the 9th SS Panzer Division Hohenstaufen (Walter Harzer) and the 10th SS Panzer Division Frundsberg (Heinz Harmel)— had moved into the area north of Arnhem to refit and reorganise. Although badly mauled in Normandy and during their escape from the Falaise pocket, the corps was made up of veterans and made available significantly more forces to the Germans than the Allies had been led to expect. The divisions were also specially trained in anti-airborne operations; during their formation both divisions had undergone month-long anti-airborne exercises whilst waiting for their heavy equipment, and had also spent the last 15 months studying the best reactions to a parachute attack in classroom and field exercises. The 9th SS had a Panzergrenadier brigade, a reconnaissance battalion, an artillery battalion, two batteries of self-propelled guns and a company of tanks. The number of men who were available after the withdrawal from Normandy is unclear. Some sources suggest that the 9th had up to 6,000 men, others suggest that the combined total of the 9th and 10th SS was only 6,000–7,000 men.

There were also Dutch units allied to the Germans present at Arnhem. These formations recruited from Dutch nationals (mainly criminals, men wishing to avoid national service or men affiliated with the Nationaal-Socialistische Beweging) and were incorporated into the German Army. At Arnhem, the partly Dutch SS Wachbattalion 3 was attached to Kampfgruppe Von Tettau and the 3rd Battalion of the 34th SS Volunteer Grenadier Division Landstorm Nederland training at nearby Hoogeveen was quickly attached to the 9th SS Panzer Division when they arrived on 20 September.

As the battle progressed, more and more forces would become available to the Germans. Adolf Hitler, stunned by the attack, agreed that the defence of the Netherlands should receive priority and reinforcements streamed in from Wehrkreis VI, the Wesel area and Armed Forces Command Netherlands (General Friedrich Christiansen). Model arranged for units to be sent straight to the units in action and rushed in specialist urban warfare and machine gun battalions. Each day of the battle, the German military strength increased whilst the British supplies diminished. By 21 September, the fifth day of the battle, German forces outnumbered the British by 3:1 and continued to increase.

Battle

Day 1 – Sunday 17 September

The first lift was preceded by intense bombing and strafing raids made by the British Second Tactical Air Force and the American 8th and 9th Air Forces. These targeted the known flak guns and German garrisons and barracks across the area. Meanwhile, the first lift suffered only light losses as the aircraft and gliders flew from British bases to the target area. The first arrivals were the 21st Independent Parachute Company, who landed at 12:40 in order to mark the landing zones for the gliders and parachutists of the main force. The landings were largely unopposed and the battalions were formed up in good order and ready to carry out their tasks by 14:45.

The Airlanding Brigade moved quickly to secure the landing zones. The 2nd Battalion, South Staffordshire Regiment moved into Wolfheze, the 1st Battalion, Border Regiment secured DZ 'X', deploying its companies around the DZ and in Renkum, and the 7th Battalion, King's Own Scottish Borderers moved to secure DZ 'Y'. Here, they ambushed the Dutch SS Wach Battalion as it headed toward Arnhem from Ede. Units of the Airlanding Artillery and Divisional HQ headed into Wolfheze and Oosterbeek where medical officers set up a Regimental Aid Post at the home of Kate ter Horst.

While the 1st Airlanding Brigade moved off from the landing zones, the 1st Parachute Brigade prepared to head east toward the bridges, with Lathbury and his HQ Company following Frost on Lion route. Although some jeeps of the reconnaissance squadron were lost on the flight over, the company formed up in good strength and moved off along Leopard route.

The Germans were unprepared for the landings and initially thrown into confusion. Model – erroneously assuming that the paratroopers had come to capture him – fled his headquarters at the Tafelberg Hotel in Oosterbeek and went to Bittrich's headquarters east of Arnhem at Doetinchem, where he took personal control of the battle. The 10th SS Division was sent south to respond to the American landings at Nijmegen and to defend the "island" (the polder between the Nederrijn and Waal rivers), while the 9th would defend Arnhem. The 9th SS was in the midst of preparing to return to Germany and Harmel was in Berlin trying to secure more men and supplies for his unit. He was instantly ordered to return to Arnhem whilst his division began to prepare its forces for battle. Obersturmbannführer Ludwig Spindler — commander of the 9th SS Armoured Artillery Regiment – quickly organised a small Kampfgruppe (battlegroup; Kampfgruppe Spindler) was initially only 120 men, but would incorporate 16 separate units over the course of the battle). In the late afternoon, he was ordered to advance west to Oosterbeek and establish a blocking line to prevent the British from reaching Arnhem centre.

The 9th SS division's 40-vehicle reconnaissance battalion under the command of Hauptsturmführer Viktor Gräbner was ordered south to Nijmegen, crossing the Arnhem bridge at dusk. Initially, however, no units were ordered to secure the bridge itself. Kussin, the Arnhem Garrison commander, was killed by men of the 3rd Parachute Battalion as he sped towards his headquarters, and his death led to a breakdown of the German command. It was not until late in the afternoon that the Reconnaissance Battalion of 10th SS Division were ordered to secure the bridge. At the time of the landings, only one organised unit was in place to oppose the Allied advance toward the bridges (the 16th SS Training Battalion camped in Wolfheze) and their commander – Sepp Krafft – acted quickly to establish a blocking screen west of Oosterbeek.

The Allied advance quickly ran into trouble. The reconnaissance squadron was ambushed by the northern flank of Krafft's blocking line and withdrew. The 1st and 3rd Parachute Battalions were also stalled by Krafft's defences and spent the rest of the day skirting his line. The 3rd Parachute Battalion went south and halted in Oosterbeek for most of the night while 1st Parachute Battalion went further north but hit Spindler's forces and was unable to reach the Arnhem-Ede road of Leopard route. Instead Dobie decided to abandon his original plan, and head towards the bridge to assist Frost instead. The battalion headed south into Oosterbeek overnight. Only the 2nd Parachute Battalion was largely unopposed, bypassing the defences that did not as yet reach down as far as the river. They were slowed by cheering Dutch civilians and did not reach the bridges until late in the day. The railway bridge was blown by German engineers as the Allies approached it and the pontoon bridge was missing its central section. At dusk, the men of A Company under Major Digby Tatham-Warter observed Gräbner's force cross the bridge, on their way to Nijmegen. Most of the battalion and various other supporting units—including two jeeps of Gough's squadron, four 6-pounder anti-tank guns, Brigade HQ (without Lathbury), and Royal Engineers (in total numbering about 740 men)— moved into Arnhem centre as night fell.

Owing to the oversight in German orders, the British were able to secure the undefended northern end of the road bridge. Lieutenant Jack Grayburn led an attempt to secure the southern end of the bridge but was unsuccessful, and a later attempt using a flame thrower only succeeded in setting the freshly painted girders of the bridge alight. However, the British were able to make good their position and quickly repulsed the 10th SS Reconnaissance Battalion and other German units when they arrived to secure the bridge.

The Allied advance was severely hampered by poor communications in these crucial initial phases. The paratroopers' radio sets range was instantly limited by the wooded terrain and as the battalions advanced they lost contact with Divisional HQ at the landing zones. Over the coming nine days, radio communication within the division, with Browning's HQ at Nijmegen, with XXX Corps and with the United Kingdom would be intermittent and unreliable, severely hampering the British units. Carrier pigeons were even used to make contact with Britain. Partly as a consequence of this limitation, Urquhart decided to follow the 1st Parachute Brigade and make contact with Lathbury. When he found the Brigade HQ on Lion route, he was informed by Major Hibbert, who, at that time, was still en route to the bridge, that Lathbury himself was visiting the 3rd Battalion. Urquhart followed Lathbury there but subsequently would not be able to return to Divisional HQ for two days.

Day 2 – Monday 18 September

As the second day dawned, the 9th SS Panzer Division continued to reinforce the German blocking line. Krafft's unit withdrew overnight and joined Spindler's line, coming under his command. Spindler's force was now becoming so large as more men and units arrived at the new front, that he was forced to split it into two battle groups: Kampfgruppen Allworden and Harder. The defensive line now blocked the entire western side of Arnhem and had just closed the gap exploited by Frost alongside the river the previous evening.

Overnight, the 1st and 3rd Parachute battalions had skirted as far south as 2nd Parachute Battalion's original Lion route, hoping to follow them into Arnhem centre. They approached the German line on the outskirts of the town before light and for several hours attempted to fight through the German positions. Spindler's force—being continually reinforced—was too strong to penetrate, and by 10:00 the British advance was stopped. A more coordinated attack followed in the afternoon, but it too was repulsed. Urquhart attempted to return to his Divisional Headquarters at Oosterbeek but became cut off and was forced to take shelter in a Dutch family's loft with two fellow officers. Lathbury was injured and also forced into hiding.

At the road bridge, German forces of the 9th SS had quickly surrounded Frost's battalion, cutting them off from the rest of the division. At around 09:00, the 9th SS Reconnaissance Battalion headed back toward Arnhem from south of the river, having concluded that it was not needed at Nijmegen. Though aware of the British troops at the bridge, it attempted to cross by force. In the resultant two-hour battle, it was beaten back with heavy losses; 12 out of the battalion's 22 armored vehicles involved in the assault were destroyed or knocked out and its commanding officer, Viktor Gräbner, was killed in action. German attacks carried on around the British perimeter at the Arnhem bridge for the rest of the day, but the British continued to hold.

At the landing zones, Urquhart's Chief of Staff Lt. Col Charles Mackenzie informed Brigadier Hicks that, in Urquhart's and Lathbury's absence, he was acting divisional commander. Mackenzie also advised him to send one of his units – the South Staffords (which was not complete and was awaiting its full complement of men in the second lift) — to Arnhem to help with the advance to the bridge. The South Staffords departed in the morning and linked up with the 1st Parachute Battalion in the late afternoon.

German forces began to probe the 1st Airlanding Brigade defences throughout the morning. Units of Kampfgruppe Von Tettau attacked the Border's positions; men of the SS NCO school overran Renkum and Kriegsmarine troops engaged the British all day as they withdrew. Minor fighting broke out around LZ 'X' but not enough to seriously hamper the glider landing there. At DZ 'Y', the Dutch SS Wach Battalion became heavily engaged with the King's Own Scottish Borderers, threatening to hamper the arrival of the second lift. The communications breakdown meant that it was impossible to warn the aircraft. Equally, there was no way for the division to know that the 2nd lift had been delayed by ground fog in England. Thus, the arrival of the 4th Parachute Brigade under Brigadier Hackett and several more troops of artillery at the drop zones was several hours overdue. When the parachutists did arrive after 15:00, they dropped under fire. Several were killed as aircraft and parachutists were shot down and the heath-land they were landing on burned. Nevertheless, the arrival of a full brigade overwhelmed the Dutch who were routed and surrendered in droves.

Despite the setbacks the units assembled with only slight casualties, but the changing circumstances at Arnhem meant that their roles were quickly changed. The 11th Parachute Battalion and the rest of the South Staffords were immediately despatched to Arnhem to assist in the attempt to break through to the bridge, where they linked up with the 1st and 3rd Parachute Battalions after dark. Hicks' decision to send the 11th Parachute Battalion to Arnhem (thus weakening the 4th Parachute Brigade), dismayed Hackett, who remonstrated with Hicks to no avail. However, he was given command of the King's Own Scottish Borderers who were moving toward LZ 'L' to secure it for Tuesday's landing. The 10th and 156th Parachute Battalions moved north of the railway line to take up their planned defensive positions north west of Arnhem, but the leading elements of 156th Parachute Battalion made contact with the main 9th SS blocking line after dark and withdrew for the night.

Shortly after the second lift arrived, the first supply drop was made onto LZ 'L'. Although most supplies arrived, only a small amount could be collected as the area was not under full British control. The poor radio communication meant that it was not possible to alert the RAF and unsecured drop zones would be a major problem in the days to come.

Day 3 – Tuesday 19 September

When the South Staffords and 11th Parachute Battalion arrived at the 1st and 3rd Parachute Battalion's positions on the western outskirts of Arnhem, the British hoped to have sufficient troops to break through to Frost's position at the bridge. Lieutenant Colonel Dobie of 1st Parachute Battalion planned to attack before first light but an erroneous report suggesting that the bridge had fallen led to the attack being cancelled. By the time the report was corrected first light was not long away, but, with reinforcement at the bridge the priority, the attack had to proceed. The advance began on a narrow front between the railway line to the north and the river to the south. The 1st Parachute Battalion would lead, supported by remnants of the 3rd Parachute Battalion, with the 2nd South Staffordshires on the left flank and the 11th Parachute Battalion following behind. As soon as it became light, the 1st Parachute Battalion was spotted and halted by fire from the main German defensive line. Trapped in open ground and under heavy fire from three sides, the 1st Parachute Battalion disintegrated and what remained of the 3rd Parachute Battalion fell back.

The 2nd South Staffordshires were similarly cut off and save for about 150 men, overcome by midday. The 11th Parachute Battalion – which had thus far not been heavily involved – was now overwhelmed in exposed positions while attempting to capture high ground to the north. The South Staffords similarly attempted to secure high ground but were driven off. As they approached Oosterbeek they were met by Lieutenant Colonel Sheriff Thompson, of the 1st Airlanding Light Artillery Regiment, who formed most of the men into a defensive screen under Major Robert Cain  forward of his artillery positions. The battle gave Urquhart the opportunity to escape from his hiding place and he was able to return to Division HQ at the Hotel Hartenstein in Oosterbeek, where for the first time he was able to learn the extent of the German forces facing them. In Britain, ground fog again frustrated reinforcement. Thirty-five gliders of the 3rd lift carrying the Polish glider borne elements were delayed in taking off and the whole parachute brigade failed to take off at all. This would have serious consequences on the ground when the delayed gliders arrived.

North of the railway line, the 156th and 10th Parachute Battalions became engaged with the German defensive line as they attempted to seize the high ground in the woods north of Oosterbeek. Both battalions' advances were blunted against the well-defended German positions and by early afternoon they had not advanced any further than their original positions. Urquhart—realising the need to assume a more defensive stance and prevent the two battalions being cut off north of the railway—ordered them to fall back to Wolfheze and Oosterbeek. Making a fighting withdrawal with the Germans of Kampfgruppe Krafft closely pursuing them, the units fell back across LZ 'L', defended by the King's Own Scottish Borderers who were awaiting the arrival of the glider borne elements of the Polish Parachute Brigade. Heavy fighting ensued as the gliders arrived in the middle of the retreat and Polish losses were heavy. All four Allied units streamed south and west toward the road crossings over the steep railway cutting at Oosterbeek and Wolfheze and gathered in ad hoc units in the woods on the south side, where most of them spent the night. Some German units followed them across the railway and an SS battalion reached Wolfheze, but was stopped when it was strafed by its own air force.

The Germans – who had been expecting resupply efforts – had moved five flak batteries into the area specifically to attack these flights and, as the RAF came into view, they succeeded in shooting down 10 aircraft. Despite the bravery of the pilots (Flight Lieutenant David Lord received the Victoria Cross posthumously), the Airborne forces only recovered  of supplies. The dropzone – Supply DZ 'V' — was still in German hands (the British would never reach this zone during the battle) and no message had reached Britain to explain this. At the bridge, Frost's forces continued to hold but without supply or reinforcement their position was becoming weaker. The Germans – realising that infantry attacks were unlikely to remove the stubborn defenders – began to systematically destroy the houses the British were in using tanks, artillery, and mortars. In the absence of any Allied air cover, the Luftwaffe were able to make strafing runs on the British occupied houses as well.

Day 4 – Wednesday 20 September

By now, the 1st Airborne division was too weak to attempt to reach Frost at the bridge. Eight of the nine infantry battalions were badly mauled or scattered and only one – 1st Battalion, The Border Regiment – still existed as a unit. Urquhart made the difficult decision to abandon the 2nd Parachute Battalion to fend for itself. By forming a defensive perimeter around Oosterbeek and securing the Driel ferry crossing, Urquhart hoped to hold out until XXX Corps could reach them and establish a new bridgehead over the Rhine.

The eastern side of this new perimeter was fairly stable after the previous day's retreat from Arnhem, with numerous ad hoc units under company commanders defending the approaches to Oosterbeek. Major Richard Lonsdale had taken command of the outlying units and their positions weathered heavy German attacks before falling back to the main divisional perimeter. This sector was later designated Lonsdale Force and would remain the main line of defence on the south eastern perimeter. The Border Regiment held most of the western edge of the town, with scattered units filling the gaps to the north. As more units fell back to the new defensive area, they were re-organised to establish a thumb-shaped perimeter using the Nederrijn as its southern base.

The men broke out of the hollow in the late afternoon and approximately 90 of them made it to the Border Regiment's positions.

The afternoon's supply drop was little better than the previous day's. Although a message had reached Britain to arrange a new dropping zone near the Hotel Hartenstein, some aircraft flew to LZ 'Z' where their supplies fell into German hands. At Oosterbeek, the Germans had used British marker panels and flares to attract the aircraft to their positions and the aircraft were unable to distinguish the exact dropping zones. Ten of the 164 aircraft involved were shot down around Arnhem for only 13% of supplies reaching British hands.

At the bridge, Frost was finally able to make radio contact with his divisional commander Urquhart and was given the difficult news that reinforcement was doubtful. Shortly afterwards, at about 13:30, Frost was injured in the legs by a mortar bomb and command passed to Major Gough. Despite their stubborn defence of the few buildings they still held, by late afternoon the British position was becoming untenable. When fire took hold of many of the buildings in which the wounded were being treated, a two-hour truce was organised in the late afternoon and the wounded (including Frost) were taken into captivity. Overnight, a few units managed to hold out for a little longer and several groups tried to break out toward the Oosterbeek perimeter, although almost all of them, including Major Hibbert, were captured.

By 05:00 on Thursday morning all resistance at the bridge had ceased. In later years Walter Harzer claimed that, during the final hours of fighting, his men intercepted a radio message sent from the bridge that ended with the sentences: "Out of ammunition. God Save the King."

Day 5 – Thursday 21 September

Throughout the morning, the Germans mopped up British survivors and stragglers in hiding around Arnhem bridge. It took several hours to clear the bridge of debris allowing German armour to cross and reinforce Nijmegen. Crucially, the British had held the bridge long enough to allow Nijmegen bridge to be captured by the 82nd Airborne and Guards' Armoured Division working together. With the resistance at the bridge crushed, the Germans had more troops available to commit to the Oosterbeek engagement, although this changed suddenly in the afternoon.

Delayed by weather, the parachute infantry battalions of Stanisław Sosabowski's 1st (Polish) Parachute Brigade were finally able to take off in England. 114 C-47s took off but 41 aircraft turned back after Troop Carrier Command decided it would be too dangerous to land if the aircraft were up too long. The remainder pressed on; they did not have the correct transmission codes and did not understand the messages. One of the few messages to get out of Arnhem warned the Poles that DZ 'K' was not secure and to land instead on the polder east of Driel where they should secure the Heveadorp ferry on the south bank of the Rhine. The Poles dropped under fire at 17:00 and sustained casualties but assembled in good order. Advancing to the river bank, they discovered that the ferry was gone; the ferryman had sunk it to deny its use to the Germans.

The arrival of the Poles relieved the pressure on the British as the Germans were forced to send more forces south of the Rhine. Fearing an attack on the southern end of the road bridge or the Nijmegen road, a battalion of the 34th SS Volunteer Grenadier Division Landstorm Nederland, Machine Gun Battalion 47 and other Kampfgruppes headed across the river overnight.

At Oosterbeek, the defensive positions were consolidated and organised into two zones. Hicks would command the western and northern sides of the perimeter and Hackett, after some rest, the eastern front. The perimeter was not a complete defensive line but a collection of defensive pockets in houses and foxholes surrounding the centre of Oosterbeek, with the divisional headquarters at the Hotel Hartenstein at its centre. The perimeter was roughly  around and was defended by approximately 3,600 men. Despite the Germans' best efforts, the line would remain roughly unchanged for the next five days, although Germans of the Hermann Göring NCO School attacked the Border positions on the west side near the Rhine, forcing them to abandon strategically important high ground overlooking Oosterbeek. The biggest boost to the besieged British was being able to make contact with forward artillery units of XXX Corps. Radio contact was made with 64th Medium Regiment, Royal Artillery who were able to drop heavy and accurate shellfire on German positions around the perimeter. The radio link to the battery's Headquarters was also used as the main line of communication to XXX Corps. So important was the shellfire provided by 64 Medium Regiment that afterward Urquhart lobbied (unsuccessfully) for the regiment to be able to wear the airborne Pegasus badge on their uniforms.

The British had witnessed the Polish drop but were unable to make contact by radio so a swimmer (Private Ernest Henry Archer) was sent south of the Rhine. The British planned to supply rafts for a river crossing that night as the Poles were desperately needed on the northern bank. The Poles waited on the southern bank, but by 03:00 no rafts were evident and they withdrew to Driel to take up defensive positions.

Day 6 – Friday 22 September

Overnight, the Germans south of the river formed a blocking line along the railway, linking up with 10th SS to the south and screening the road bridge from the Poles. The Polish were well dug in at Driel, however, and German armour was unable to manoeuvre off of the main roads to attack them. Hopes were raised when three armoured cars of XXX Corps' Household Cavalry managed to skirt the German defences on the island and link up with Sosabowski's force. These were followed after dark by tanks of the 4th/7th Royal Dragoon Guards and infantry of the 5th Battalion Duke of Cornwall's Light Infantry. Behind them, the rest of the 43rd Wessex Division was making its way up a narrow corridor.

In Oosterbeek, heavy fighting continued around the perimeter. Intense shelling and snipers increased the number of casualties at the aid posts in the hotels and houses of the town. Bittrich ordered that the attacks be stepped up and the British bridgehead north of the Rhine destroyed, and at 09:00 the major attacks began with the various Kampfgruppen of 9th SS attacking from the east and Kampfgruppe von Tettaus units from the west. There were only small gains but these attacks were followed by simultaneous attacks in the afternoon when the Germans made determined moves on the northern and eastern ends. To the north, they succeeded in briefly forcing back the King's Own Scottish Borderers before the latter counterattacked and retook their positions. Urquhart realised the futility of holding the tactically unimportant tip however and ordered the units in the north to fall back and defend a shorter line. To the east, the remains of 10th Parachute Battalion were nearly annihilated in their small position on the main Arnhem road, but the Germans failed to gain any significant ground.

Two of Urquhart's staff officers swam the Rhine during the day and made contact with Sosabowski's HQ. It was arranged that six rubber boats should be supplied on the northern bank to enable the Poles to cross the river and come into the Oosterbeek perimeter. That night the plan was put into operation but the cable designed to run the boats across broke and the small oars were not enough to paddle across the fast-flowing river. Only 55 Poles made it across before light and only 35 of these made it into the perimeter.

Day 7 – Saturday 23 September

Spindler was ordered to switch his attacks further south to try to force the British away from the river, isolating the British from any hope of reinforcement and allowing them to be destroyed. Despite their best efforts, however, they were unsuccessful, although the constant artillery and assaults continued to wear the British defences down further.

A break in the weather allowed the RAF to finally fly combat missions against the German forces surrounding Urquhart's men. Hawker Typhoons and Republic P-47 Thunderbolts strafed German positions throughout the day and occasionally duelled with the Luftwaffe over the battlefield. The RAF attempted their final resupply flight from Britain on the Saturday afternoon, but lost eight planes for little gain to the airborne troops. Some small resupply efforts would be made from Allied airfields in Europe over the next two days but to little effect.

South of the river, the Poles prepared for another crossing. That night, they awaited the arrival of assault boats from XXX Corps, but these did not arrive until after midnight, and many were without oars. The crossings started at 03:00, with fire support from the 43rd Wessex Division. Through the remaining hours of darkness, only 153 men were able to cross – less than ¼ of the hoped for reinforcement.

Day 8 – Sunday 24 September

In the morning, Horrocks visited the Polish positions at Driel to see the front for himself. Later, he held a conference attended by Browning, Major-General Ivor Thomas of the 43rd (Wessex) Division and Sosabowski at Valburg. In a controversial meeting in which Sosabowski was politically outmanoeuvred, it was decided that another crossing would be attempted that night. When the Germans cut the narrow supply road near Nijmegen later that day, it seems that Horrocks realised the futility of the situation and plans were drawn up to withdraw the 1st Airborne Division.

In Oosterbeek, the situation was desperate; Hackett was wounded in the morning and had to give up the eastern command. The RAF attempted some close support around the perimeter which just held but shelling and sniping increased casualties by the hour. The aid stations were occupied by 2,000 men, British, German and Dutch civilian casualties. Because many aid posts were in the front line, in homes taken over earlier in the battle, the odd situation was created where casualties were evacuated forward rather than rearwards. Without evacuation, the wounded were often injured again and some posts changed hands between the British and Germans several times as the perimeter was fought over.

During the fighting around Oosterbeek, there had been short, local truces around the aid posts to allow the wounded to reach them but on Sunday Colonel Graeme Warrack—the senior medical officer—asked Urquhart permission to arrange a truce. Warrack was taken to see Bittrich who agreed and offered Warrack as many supplies as he could carry. Between 15:00 and 17:00, a general ceasefire began around the perimeter and about 450 stretcher cases and walking wounded were evacuated from the perimeter, the Germans using jeeps and ambulances to take serious cases straight to Saint Elisabeth Hospital in Arnhem where British, German and Dutch medical staff worked together.

That night, the Allies on the south side of the river attempted another crossing. The plan called for 4th Battalion The Dorset Regiment and the 1st Polish Parachute Battalion to cross at 22:00 using boats and DUKWs. Sosabowski was furious at having to give up control of one of his battalions and thought the plan dangerous but was overruled. The boats took until 1:00 a.m. to arrive, several having been destroyed or lost en route; in a last minute change of plan, only the Dorsets would cross. The small boats, without skilled crews, the strong current and poor choice of landing site on the north bank meant that of the 315 men who embarked, only a handful reached the British lines on the other side. The DUKWs and most boats landed too far downstream and at least 200 men were captured.

Day 9 – Monday 25 September

During the night, a copy of the withdrawal plan was sent across the river to Urquhart. Despite the obviously frustrating content, Urquhart knew there was little other choice. He radioed Thomas at 08:00 and agreed to the plan provided it went ahead that night. The Airborne forces would need to endure another day in their perimeter. More men were evacuated from the aid posts throughout the day but there was no official truce and this was sometimes done under fire. At 10:00, the Germans began their most successful assault on the perimeter, attacking the south-eastern end with infantry supported by newly arrived Tiger tanks. This assault pushed through the defenders' outer lines and threatened to isolate the bulk of the division from the river. Strong counter-attacks from the defenders and concentrated shellfire from south of the river eventually repulsed the Germans.

Urquhart made his withdrawal plan on the model used in the evacuation of Gallipoli during the First World War. The northernmost units would fall back first, moving through the more southerly groups who would then follow behind. The Glider Pilots would organise the routes to the river and the operation would be covered by an intense artillery bombardment from XXX Corps. South of the river the evacuation was organised and staffed by men of the 43rd (Wessex) Divisional engineers and Royal Canadian Engineers, using rafts and storm boats. To keep the operation secret, the plan was not announced until the afternoon and some men (mainly wounded) would remain to provide covering fire through the night. Men were ordered to muffle their boots and weapons to help them bypass German incursions into the perimeter. Some men took the opportunity to shave before withdrawing, providing quite a morale boost.

By 21:00, heavy rain had begun to fall, which helped disguise the withdrawal. The bombardment commenced and the units began to fall back to the river. Half of the engineers' boats were too far west to be used (the 43rd (Wessex) Division mistakenly believing the crossing points used by the Dorsets the previous night were in British hands), slowing the evacuation. The Germans shelled the withdrawal, believing it to be a supply attempt. At 05:00, the operation was ended lest the coming light enable the Germans to fire onto the boats more accurately. A total of 2,163 Airborne men, 160 Poles, 75 Dorsets and several dozen other men were evacuated but about 300 men were left behind on the northern bank when the operation was stopped and 95 men were killed overnight during the evacuation.

During the morning of 26 September, the Germans pressed home their attacks and cut off the bridgehead from the river. It was not until about noon that they realised the British had gone. Later in the day, they rounded up about 600 men, mostly wounded in aid stations and those left behind on the north bank, as well as some pockets of resistance that had been out of radio contact with division headquarters and did not know about the withdrawal.

Aftermath

The Allies withdrew from the southern bank of the Rhine and the front remained on "the island" between the Rhine and Waal rivers. The Germans counter-attacked in October at the Battle of the Nijmegen salient and were repulsed; the front line in the area remained stable until after the winter. The bridgeheads across the Maas and Waal served as an important base for operations against the Germans on the Rhine and Operation Veritable into Germany.

The Polish brigade was moved to Nijmegen to defend the withdrawal of British troops in Operation Berlin before returning to England in early October. Shortly afterwards, the British scapegoated Sosabowski and the Polish Brigade for the failure at Arnhem, perhaps to cover their own failings. On 17 October, Montgomery informed Alan Brooke—Chief of the Imperial General Staff—that he felt the Polish forces had "fought very badly" at Arnhem and that he did not want them under his command. David Bennett wrote that Montgomery had almost certainly been fed gross misinformation that supported his prejudices.

A month later Browning wrote a long letter, highly critical of Sosabowski, to Brooke's deputy. In it, he accused Sosabowski of being difficult, unadaptable, argumentative and "loth to play his full part in the operation unless everything was done for him and his brigade". It is possible that Browning wanted unfairly to blame Sosabowski, although it may equally have been the work of officers of the 43rd Division. Browning recommended that Sosabowski be replaced – suggesting Lieutenant Colonel Jachnik or Major Tonn – and in December the Polish government in exile duly dismissed him, in a move almost certainly made under British pressure.

Carlo D'Este wrote "Sosabowski, an experienced and highly competent officer, was removed because he had become an embarrassment to Browning's own ineptitude. Had Sosabowski's counsel been heeded the battle might have been won, even at the eleventh hour." Although it may be fair to say that Sosabowski was difficult to work with, his scapegoating is judged a disgrace in the accounts of many historians. Brian Urquhartwho had done so much to warn his superiors about the dangers of Arnhemdescribed the criticism of Sosabowski and the brigade as "grotesque" and his dismissal as a "shameful act".

Arnhem was a victory for the Germans (albeit tempered by their losses further south) and a defeat for the Second Army. Many military commentators and historians believe that the failure to secure Arnhem was not the fault of the airborne forces (who had held out for far longer than planned) but of the operation. John Frost noted that "by far the worst mistake was the lack of priority given to the capture of Nijmegen Bridge" and was unable to understand why Browning had ordered Brigadier General James M. Gavin, the commander of the 82nd Airborne Division to secure the Groesbeek Heights before Nijmegen Bridge. In his analysis of the battle, Martin Middlebrook believed the "failure of Browning to give the 82nd US Airborne Division a greater priority in capturing the bridge at Nijmegen" was only just behind the weakness of the air plan in importance.

In his assessment of the German perspective at Arnhem, Robert Kershaw concluded that "the battle on the Waal at Nijmegen proved to be the decisive event" and that Arnhem became a simple matter of containment after the British had retreated into the Oosterbeek perimeter. After that, it was merely "a side-show to the crisis being enacted on the Waal". Heinz Harmel asserted that "The Allies were stopped in the south just north of Nijmegen – that is why Arnhem turned out as it did". Gavin commented that "there was no failure at Arnhem. If, historically, there remains an implication of failure it was the failure of the ground forces to arrive in time to exploit the initial gains of the [1st] Airborne Division".

The air plan was a grave weakness in the events at Arnhem. Middlebrook believes that the refusal to consider night drops, two lifts on day 1 or a coup-de-main assault on Arnhem bridge were "cardinal fundamental errors" and that the failure to land nearer the bridge threw away the airborne force's most valuable asset – that of surprise. Frost believed that the distance from the drop zones to the bridge and the long approach on foot was a "glaring snag" and was highly critical of the "unwillingness of the air forces to fly more than one sortie in the day [which] was one of the chief factors that mitigated against success".

The Allies' failure to secure a bridge over the Lower Rhine spelled the end of Market Garden. While all other objectives had been achieved, the failure to secure the Arnhem road bridge over the Rhine meant that the operation failed in its ultimate objective. Montgomery claimed that the operation was 90 per cent successful and the Allies had driven a deep salient into German-occupied territory that was quickly reinforced. Milton Shulman observed that the operation had driven a wedge into the German positions, isolating the 15th Army north of Antwerp from the First Parachute Army on the eastern side of the bulge. This complicated the supply problem of the 15th Army and removed the chance of the Germans being able to assemble enough troops for a serious counter-attack to retake Antwerp. Chester Wilmot agreed with this, claiming that the salient was of immense tactical value for the purpose of driving the Germans from the area south of the Maas and removing the threat of an immediate counterattack against Antwerp. Kershaw wrote that the north flank of the west wall was not turned and the 15th Army was able to escape. John Warren wrote that the Allies controlled a salient leading nowhere. John Waddy wrote that the strategic and tactical debate of Market Garden will never be resolved.

Arnhem was described as "a tactical change of plan, designed to meet a favourable local situation within the main plan of campaign" but the result "dispelled the hope that the enemy would be beaten before the winter. First and Third U.S. Armies had already been checked, the former at Aachen and in the Ardennes, the latter at Metz and south of Nancy. The failure to outflank the Siegfried Line finally dictated the pause in the general advance which Montgomery had feared" and meant that General Dwight D. Eisenhower "turned to Antwerp, which despite the long-delayed capture of Le Havre on 12 September, of Brest on the 18th and of Calais on the 30th, remained, as the closest, largest and best-preserved of the ports, the necessary solution to the difficulties of supply.

Allied casualties
The battle was a costly defeat for the 1st Airborne Division from which it never recovered. Three-quarters of the division were missing when it returned to England, including two of the three brigade commanders, eight of the nine battalion commanders and 26 of the 30 infantry company commanders. About 500 men were in hiding north of the Rhine and many of these were able to escape during the winter, initially in Operation Pegasus. New recruits, escapees and repatriated POWs joined the division over the coming months but the division was still so understrength that the 4th Parachute Brigade had to be merged into the 1st Parachute Brigade and the division could barely produce two brigades of infantry. Between May and August 1945, many of the men were sent to Denmark and Norway to oversee the Operation Doomsday the German surrenders but on their return the division was disbanded. The Glider Pilot Regiment suffered the highest proportion of fatal casualties during the battle (17.3 per cent). The regiment was so badly depleted that during Operation Varsity RAF pilots were used to fly many of the gliders. As glider operations were abolished after the war, the regiment shrank and was eventually disbanded in 1957.

Axis casualties

German casualty figures are less complete than those of the Allies and official figures have never been released. A signal, possibly sent by II SS Panzer Corps on 27 September, listed 3,300 casualties (1,300 killed and 2,000 injured) around Arnhem and Oosterbeek. Robert Kershaw's assessment of the incomplete records identified at least 2,500 casualties. In the Roll of Honour: Battle of Arnhem 17–26 September 1944, J.A. Hey of the Society of Friends of the Airborne Museum, Oosterbeek identified 1,725 German dead from the Arnhem area. All of these figures are significantly higher than Model's conservative estimate of 3,300 casualties for the entire Market Garden area of battle (which included Eindhoven and Nijmegen).

Arnhem
Dutch records suggest that at least 453 civilians died during the battle, either as a result of Allied bombing on the first day or during the subsequent fighting. After the battle, the residents of Arnhem and its surrounding towns and villages were evicted from their homes, allowing the Germans to turn the north bank of the Rhine into an elaborate defensive position. Residents were not allowed to return home without a permit and most did not return until after the war. The Dutch homes were then systematically looted, with the spoils being sent to bombing victims in Germany. The Germans continued to fight Allied forces on the plains between Arnhem and Nijmegen. On 7 October, the Arnhem bridge was bombed and destroyed by Martin B-26 Marauders of 344th Bomb Group, USAAF. The buildings of Arnhem were bombarded by the Allies over the next few months and suffered further during the Liberation of Arnhem in April 1945.

Honours and memorials

Although the battle was a disaster for the British 1st Airborne Division, their fight north of the Rhine is considered an example of courage and endurance and one of the greatest feats of arms in the Second World War. Despite being the last great failure of the British Army, Arnhem has become a byword for the fighting spirit of the British people and has set a standard for the Parachute Regiment. Montgomery claimed that "in years to come it will be a great thing for a man to be able to say: 'I fought at Arnhem'", a prediction seemingly borne out by the pride of soldiers who took part, and the occasional desire of those who did not to claim that they were there.

Within days of Operation Berlin, the British returned to a heroes' welcome in England. A list of 59 decorations was quickly published for the 2,000 men who had returned and an investiture ceremony for the division was held at Buckingham Palace in December. Decorations for the 6000 who had not returned were not published until September 1945 and numbered only 25.

Five of the British participants in the battle were awarded Britain's highest award for gallantry, the Victoria Cross. Four were members of the Airborne forces and one was from the RAF. They were:
 Lance-Sergeant John Baskeyfield, 2nd Battalion, South Staffordshire Regiment
 Major Robert Cain, 2nd Battalion, South Staffordshire Regiment
 Flight Lieutenant David Lord 271 Squadron, Royal Air Force
 Captain Lionel Queripel, 10th Battalion, Parachute Regiment
 Lieutenant John Grayburn, 2nd Battalion, Parachute Regiment

The British and Commonwealth system of battle honours recognised participation in fighting at Arnhem in 1956, 1957 and 1958 by the award of the battle honour Arnhem 1944 to six units. After the liberation of the Netherlands, the Grave Registration units of 2nd Army began the task of identifying the British dead. They were buried together in a field that is on permanent loan to the Commonwealth War Graves Commission just north of Oosterbeek. There are nearly 1,800 graves in what is now known as the Airborne Cemetery, ¾ of which are for those killed during the 1944 battle. By 2003, there were still 138 men unaccounted for and human remains, equipment and weaponry continue to be dug up in the farmland around the city.

In Germany, the battle was treated as a great victory and afterward no fewer than eight men were awarded the Knight's Cross of the Iron Cross. The German dead were gathered together and buried in the SS Heroes Cemetery near Arnhem, but after the war they were reburied in Ysselsteyn.

The shattered Arnhem road bridge was briefly replaced by a succession of Bailey bridges before being rebuilt in the same style as the original. It was renamed John Frostbrug (literally 'John Frost Bridge') on 17 December 1977. On 31 May 2006, HM Queen Beatrix of the Netherlands conferred two honours on the Polish forces who fought at the battle. The Polish 1st Independent Airborne Brigade was awarded the Dutch Military William Order for gallantry and Stanisław Sosabowski was posthumously awarded the Bronze Lion. In February of that year, an appeal was launched to raise funds so that a memorial to General Sosabowski and the brigade could be erected. The memorial was unveiled in September 2006 in a ceremony that sought to undo the injustice of 1944.

Eusebius Church, which was largely destroyed, also lost its 32-bell carillon dated 1652. Petit & Fritsen constructed a new, 49-bell carillon for the reconstructed church between 1958 and 1964. Since then, the carillon became associated with the yearly war memorial services held each May. In 1994, 50 years after the Battle of Arnhem, four bass bells were added to the instrument, with the largest funded by several English organizations. One of the 1994 bells features a quote from the book and film A Bridge Too Far.

The Hotel Hartenstein, used by Urquhart as his headquarters, is now the home of the Airborne Museum. Several other memorials were built in Arnhem and Oosterbeek, and an annual parade is held in the area. A memorial near the museum reads: "To the People of Gelderland; 50 years ago British and Polish Airborne soldiers fought here against overwhelming odds to open the way into Germany and bring the war to an early end. Instead we brought death and destruction for which you have never blamed us. This stone marks our admiration for your great courage remembering especially the women who tended our wounded. In the long winter that followed your families risked death by hiding Allied soldiers and Airmen while members of the resistance led many to safety."

In popular culture

The progress of the battle was widely reported in the British press, thanks largely to the efforts of two BBC reporters (Stanley Maxted and Guy Byam) and three journalists (newspaper reporters Alan Wood of the Daily Express and Jack Smyth of Reuters) who accompanied the British forces. The journalists had their reports sent back almost daily – ironically making communication with London at a time when Divisional Signals had not. The division was also accompanied by a three-man team from the Army Film and Photographic Unit who recorded much of the battle – including many of the images on this page.

In 1945, Louis Hagen, a Jewish refugee from Germany and a British army glider pilot present at the battle, wrote Arnhem Lift, believed to be the first book published about the events at Arnhem. In the same year filming began for the war movie Theirs is the Glory, which featured some original footage and used 120 Arnhem veterans as extras in most of the other scenes. In 1974 Cornelius Ryan's book A Bridge Too Far, brought the battle to a wider audience, as did Richard Attenborough's adaptation of the book into the film of the same name in 1977. Frost, Urquhart and Arnhem veteran John Waddy were hired as military consultants.

English author Richard Adams, himself an officer in the sea tail of 250th (Airborne) Light Company, Royal Army Service Corps, based the struggle of the anthropomorphised rabbits in his 1972 novel Watership Down (adapted into an animated film in 1978) on the adventures of the officers of the 250 Company of the 1st Airborne Division at Arnhem.

In 1982, Attactix Adventure Games adapted some events of the battle into a board game.

See also
 Arnhem Oosterbeek War Cemetery
 Evacuation of Arnhem, the evacuation of civilians from Arnhem by German forces on 24 and 25 September 1944, lasting until April 1945
 Operation Fustian, 1st Parachute Brigade's previous airborne operation during the Invasion of Sicily.
 Operation Ladbroke, 1st Airlanding Brigade's operation during the Invasion of Sicily.
 Operation Pegasus, the escape of several Arnhem survivors a month after the battle.
 Second Battle of Arnhem, the April 1945 liberation of the city.
 William of Orange (pigeon)

References

Bibliography
 
 
 
 
 
 
 
  [NB: Book has no page numbers]

External links
 Operation Market Garden Battle of Arnhem books and photos
 Paradata – Arnhem The Official Airborne Assault Museum online archive.
 The Pegasus Archive Comprehensive information about the battle and Allied units.
 Hill 107 Source material relating to the events at Arnhem.
 Defending Arnhem Information about the German defenders of Arnhem.

Arnhem
Battle of Arnhem
Arnhem
Battle of Arnhem
Battle of Arnhem
Battle of Arnhem
Battles and operations of World War II involving the Netherlands
Arnhem
Military history of the Netherlands during World War II
Glider Pilot Regiment operations
Parachute Regiment (United Kingdom)
Battle of Arnhem
September 1944 events
Western European Campaign (1944–1945)
Last stands
Encirclements in World War II
Events in Arnhem